A pure land is the celestial realm of a buddha or bodhisattva in Mahayana Buddhism where many Buddhists aspire to be reborn in. 

The term "pure land" is particular to East Asian Buddhism and related traditions. In Sanskrit Buddhist sources, the equivalent concept is called a buddha-field. 

The various traditions that focus on rebirth in a pure land have been termed Pure Land Buddhism. Pure lands are also evident in the literature and traditions of Taoism and Bon.

In Indian sources 

The Mahavastu defines a buddha-field as a realm where “a tathagata, a holy one, fully and perfectly enlightened, is to be found, lives, exists and teaches the Dharma, for the benefit and happiness of the great body of beings, men and gods." 

The Indian Mahayana sutras describe many buddha-fields. Mahayana sources hold that there are an infinite number of buddhas, each with their own buddha-field where they teach the Dharma and where sentient beings can be reborn into (due to their good karmic acts). A buddha-field is a place where bodhisattvas can more easily progress spiritually on the bodhisattva path. Jan Nattier has argued that this idea became popular because the traditional understanding of the extreme length of the bodhisattva path seemed very difficult and training under a buddha in a buddha-field (especially prepared to train bodhisattvas) was seen as a faster way to buddhahood. 

Sentient beings who are reborn in these pure buddha-fields due to their good karma also contribute to the development of a Buddha-field, as can bodhisattvas who are able to travel there. These buddha-fields are therefore powerful places which are very advantageous to spiritual progress. 

According to Indian sources, the bodhisattva path, by ending all defilements, culminates in the arising of a purified buddha-field, which is the manifestation and reflection of a Buddha's activity. Mahayana sources state that bodhisattvas like Avalokiteśvara and Manjushri will obtain their own buddha-fields after they attain full buddhahood. In the Lotus Sutra, Buddha's close followers, such as Śāriputra, Mahākāśyapa, Subhuti, Maudgalyāyana and Buddha's son Rāhula are also predicted to attain their own pure lands. The relative time-flow in the pure lands may be different, with a day in one pure land being equivalent to years in another.

The purity of buddha-fields 

Mahayana sources speak of three kinds of buddha-fields: pure, impure, and mixed. An example of an "impure" field is often this world (called, Sahā - “the world to be endured"), Sakyamuni's field. Purified fields include Amitabha's buddha-field of Sukhavati. Some sutras say that Sakyamuni chose to come to an impure world due to his vast compassion. 

However, not all Mahayana texts agree that Sakyamuni's world is impure. Numerous Mahayana sutras, such as the Pañcaviṃśatisāhasrikā prajñāpāramitā, Lankavatara, Vimalakirti, and Lotus Sutras, also state that this dualism between purity and impurity is illusory and instead state that even this world is a pure buddha-field. 

Thus, according to the Vimalakirti, this seemingly impure world is actually pure. It only appears impure because the deluded and impure minds of sentient beings perceive it like that. As Paul Williams explains: "The impurity that we see is the result of impure awareness, and also the Buddha's compassion in creating a world within which impure beings can grow. Thus the real way to attain a Pure Land is to purify one's own mind. Put another way, we are already in the Pure Land if we but knew it. Whatever the realm, if it is inhabited by people with enlightened pure minds then it is a Pure Land." 

Numerous Mahayana sources also connect the concept of a purified buddhafield (pariśuddha-buddhakṣetra) with the purity of one's own mind. Hence, the Vimalakirti sutra states: "the bodhisattva who wishes to purify his buddhakṣetra should, first of all, skillfully adorn his own mind. And why? Because to the extent that the mind of a bodhisattva is pure is his buddhakṣetra purified."

Iconography 
Nakamura (1980, 1987: p. 207) establishes the Indian background of the padma imagery of the field which is evident iconographically, as well as in motif and metaphor:

Pure lands

Pure lands of the Five Tathagatas 

The five pure lands of the five Tathagatas are:
 In the center, Akaniṣṭha-Ghanavyūha, hosted by Vairocana Buddha
 In the East, Abhirati, hosted by Akṣobhya Buddha
 In the South, Śrīmat, hosted by Ratnasaṃbhava Buddha
 In the West, Sukhāvatī, hosted by Amitābha Buddha
 In the North, Karmaprasiddhi or Prakuṭā, hosted by Amoghasiddhi Buddha

Abhirati 

Abhirati of Akshobhya in the east is suggested by some scholars to be the earliest pure land mentioned in Mahayana sutras.

Sukhavati 

Chagdud Tulku Rinpoche, in discussing the Mind Stream of Lokeśvararāja that in fulfillment has come to be known as Amitābha:

Sukhāvatī is by far the most popular among Pure Land Buddhists. There are many old and recent Buddhist texts reporting the condition of its dying believers. Some Buddhists and followers of other religions claimed they went there and came back, and they were viewed as cults.

Some controversial teachings said the successors of Amitabha in Sukhāvatī would be Avalokiteśvara and Mahāsthāmaprāpta.

Other identified pure lands 
 Vulture Peak (靈鷲山釋迦淨土): While Zhiyi was chanting the Lotus Sutra, he saw the meeting of Gautama Buddha and bodhisattvas there.  Nanyue Huisi (慧思大師) said, "Only you can know that, only I can prove you".
 Inner Court of Tushita (兜率內院):  Some Buddhist scriptures have noted that Maitreya is currently teaching at the Inner Court of Tushita, with some Buddhist Masters, such as Xuanzang, expressing a wish to go there. Other Buddhist monks, such as Xuyun, have also been known to have dreamt of going to the Inner Court of Tushita. Some Yiguandao followers claimed to have traveled there. The Inner Court of Tushita was historically a popular place for Buddhists to wish to be reborn in; however, the vast majority of Pure Land Buddhists today hope to be reborn in Sukhavati.
 Vaidūryanirbhāsa (東方淨琉璃世界) of Bhaisajyaguru in the east is compared by some pure land buddhists to Amitabha's pure land in the west. Bhaisajyaguru is also said to have avatars in six other pure lands.
 The city Ketumati is described as Maitreya's pure land.    
 Zangdok Palri (the Copper-coloured Mountain) of Padmasambhava is in the earth. Dudjom Rinpoche said it was prophesied that all who had taken refuge in Padmasambhava or anyone who had any sort of connection with him would be reborn in Zangdok Palri.
 Shambhala in the Buddhist Kalachakra teachings.
 Dhagpa Khadro of Vajrayogini.
 Changle (長樂淨土) of Qinghuadadi Taiyi Jiuku Tianzun (青華大帝太乙救苦天尊) is a Taoist pure land. Taiyi Jiuku Tianzun also have Avatars in the taoist pure lands in ten directions (eight directions, up, down).

There are some pure land worlds in controversial sutras and folk religion texts.

In Tibetan Buddhism

Pure lands have been documented as arising due to the intention and aspiration of a bodhisattva such as the case of Amitābha, but other discourse has codified that they are entwined with the theory of the saṃbhogakāya and are understood to manifest effortlessly and spontaneously due to other activities of a Buddha and the pure qualities and the mysteries of the trikaya. The five features of Buddhahood - the attributes of the Sambhogakāya - play a role: perfect teacher, teaching, retinue, place and time.

The Source 
Very important to all pure abodes is the 'Source' (Sanskrit: dharmodaya) from which they dwell and which supports them, the 'Wellspring' of myriad fonts as emergent. It may be understood as an interface, portal or epiphany between the Dharmakaya and the Sambhogakaya. It is seminal in the establishment of mandalas governing the outer, inner or secret dimensions. It is the opening and consecration of the sacred space which enfolds and supports the expanse of the pure abode. In iconography it is represented by the six-pointed star, the two interlocking offset equilateral triangles that form a symmetry. This is the 'sanctum sanctorum' (Sanskrit: garbha gṛha). It later developed into the primordial purity of the lotus which supports the mandala, thangka or the murti of the deity. In temple siting it is the power place or 'spirit of place' that was augured or divined in the sacred geometry of 'geodesy' (Sanskrit: vāstu śāstra). In yoga asana, the 'source' is Vajrasana, the 'seat of enlightenment' the ancient name of Bodh Gaya and an alternate name for mahamudra or padmasana.

"Source of phenomena or qualities (chos 'byung, dharmodaya). Pundarika defines dharmodaya as that from which phenomena devoid of intrinsic nature originate. "Phenomena devoid of intrinsic nature" refers to the ten powers, the four fearlessnesses, and the other 84,000 aspects of the teachings. Their source, dharmodaya, is the pure realm, the abode of all buddhas and bodhisattvas, the place of bliss, the place of birth; it is not the place that discharges blood, urine, and regenerative fluids, i.e., the vagina. Source: Stainless Light, Toh. 1347, vol. Da, f237a3-5".

Field of Merit 
The Field of Merit (Wylie: tshogs zhing) is a pictorial representation in tree form of the triratna and the guru, employed in Tibetan Buddhism as an object of veneration when taking refuge. It is visualized internally as a part of the commencement phase of each sadhana.

The Field of Merit is a Pure Land. Each school or sect has its own distinctive form of the tree in which the numerous lineage-holders or vidyadhara and dharma protectors or dharmapala are represented.

In discussing the visualisation of the Merit Field, Namkha'i links the Three Jewels of Buddha, Dharma and Sangha with the Three Roots of Guru, Deva and Dakini:
The merit field (tshogs zhing), that is the source of all the accumulation of merit, designates the manifestation of the Three Jewels (Buddha, Dharma, Sangha) and of the Three Roots (Guru, Deva, Dakini) visualised by the practitioner.

Mandala 

Mandalas, especially sand mandalas, are 'pure lands' and may be understood as Nirmāṇakāya, as are all murti, thangka and sacred tools that have consecrated, dedicated and the 'deity' (yidam) invoked and requested to reside. Some namkha are pure lands. According to Nirmāṇakāya (as tulku) theory, nirmanakaya spontaneously arise due to the intention, aspiration, faith and devotion of the sangha.

See also
Tarwan in Mandaeism

Notes

Bibliography

 Galen, Amstutz; Blum, Mark L. (2006). Editors’ Introduction: Pure Lands in Japanese Religion. Japanese Journal of Religious Studies 33 (2), 217-221
Halkias, Georgios (2013). Luminous Bliss: a Religious History of Pure Land Literature in Tibet. With an Annotated Translation and Critical Analysis of the Orgyen-ling golden short Sukhāvatīvyūha-sūtra. University of Hawai‘i Press, 335 pages.

External links

What is the Pure Land? on Tricycle's Buddhism for Beginners Series

 
Tibetan Buddhist practices
Mahayana
Vajrayana
Pure Land Buddhism

fr:Terre pure